Mount Diamantina is a mountain on Hinchinbrook Island, off the north east coast of Queensland, Australia. It rises  out of the Coral Sea.

See also

 List of mountains of Australia

References

Diamantina